
Gmina Fałków is a rural gmina (administrative district) in Końskie County, Świętokrzyskie Voivodeship, in south-central Poland.

The gmina contains part of the protected area called Przedbórz Landscape Park.

Villages
Gmina Fałków contains the villages and settlements of Budy, Budy-Adelinów, Budy-Dobry Widok, Budy-Jakubowice, Budy-Szpinek, Budy-Szreniawa, Bulianów, Czermno, Czermno Kolonia-Stomorgi, Czermno-Kolonia, Dąbrowa, Fałków, Greszczyn, Gustawów, Julianów, Leszczyny, Olszamowice, Olszamowice-Porąbka, Papiernia, Pikule, Pląskowice, Reczków, Rudka, Rudzisko, Skórnice, Skórnice-Poręba, Smyków, Smyków-Boroniewskie, Stanisławów, Starzechowice, Studzieniec, Sulborowice, Sulborowice Oddziały, Sułków, Trawno, Turowice, Wąsosz, Wola Szkucka, Zbójno, Zbójno-Sępskie Niwy and Zygmuntów.

Neighbouring gminas
Gmina Fałków is bordered by the gminas of Przedbórz, Ruda Maleniecka, Słupia and Żarnów.

References
Polish official population figures 2006

Falkow
Końskie County